Three's A Crowd is a Big Finish Productions audio drama based on the long-running British science fiction television series Doctor Who.

Plot
The TARDIS crew arrive on an abandoned space station in orbit above Earth Colony Phoenix, a remote human colony whose inhabitants are not only cut off from Earth, but also from each other. Each colonist lives in ous own individual cell, travelling between them only via transmat, creating a population afflicted with agoraphobia. However, the colony hides a deeper secret, one which the Fifth Doctor, Peri and Erimem must uncover before it's too late.

Cast
The Doctor — Peter Davison
Peri — Nicola Bryant
Erimem — Caroline Morris
Auntie — Deborah Watling
General Makra’Thon — Richard Gauntlett
Butler — Charles Pemberton
Bellip — Lucy Beresford
Vidler — Richard Unwin
Laroq — Daniel Hogarth
Khellian Queen — Sara Carver

External links
Big Finish Productions – Three's A Crowd

2005 audio plays
Fifth Doctor audio plays